William Glen, Ph.D. (born 1932) is a geologist and historian of science. He is a former editor-at-large at Stanford University Press, former visiting scientist/historian at the U.S. Geological Survey, Menlo Park, and is currently visiting scholar at Stanford University in California.

Selected bibliography

William Glen, 1970, Exercises in Physical Geology, W.C. Brown Publishing Co., 154 pp.
William Glen, 1975, Continental Drift and Plate Tectonics Charles E. Merrill Publishing Co., Columbus, Ohio, 188 pp. 
William Glen, 1985, Continental Drift and Plate Tectonics. Second Edition, Published by Geo-Resources Associates, San Mateo, Ca., 200 pp. 
William Glen, 1982, The Road to Jaramillo: Critical Years of the Revolution in Earth Science Stanford University Press, Stanford, Ca., 459 pp. 
William Glen (ed.) 1994, The Mass-Extinction Debates: How Science Works in a Crisis Stanford University Press, Stanford, Ca., 371 pp. 
William Glen, 1959  Pliocene and Lower Pleistocene of the Western Part of the San Francisco Peninsula, University of California Publications in the Geological Sciences, University of California Press, 36, 2: 147-198, plates 15-17, 5 text figs., 1959.

References

Notes 
 Learning Stewards Interview: (See "learningstewards" channel on YouTube). Dr. Glen discusses his life's work as a historian of science.

Living people
1932 births
American geologists
Stanford University people
United States Geological Survey personnel